The Queensland Greats Awards  recognise outstanding Queenslanders for their years of dedication and contribution to the development of the state and their role in strengthening and shaping the community in Queensland, Australia. The awards are presented as part of the Queensland Day celebrations. Each award is commemorated with a plaque on a wall in the Roma Street Parkland.

History 
The awards commenced in 2001. An institution has been awarded annually since 2006. A posthumous award was added in 2015.

Award recipients

References 

Culture of Queensland
Australian awards
Lists of people from Queensland